William Ansel "Bill" Salisbury (November 12, 1876 – January 17, 1952), commonly known as Solly Salisbury, was a Major League Baseball pitcher who played in  with the Philadelphia Phillies. He batted and threw right-handed.

Salisbury had a 0-0 record, with a 13.50 ERA, in two games, in his one-year career.

External links

1876 births
1952 deaths
Major League Baseball pitchers
Baseball players from Iowa
Philadelphia Phillies players
Stockton Wasps players
Sacramento Gilt Edges players
Helena Senators players
Portland Webfoots players
Butte Miners players
San Francisco Seals (baseball) players
People from Wasco County, Oregon
People from Algona, Iowa